Wanda Jadwiga Lewis is a Polish-British civil engineer known for her work on the design of tensile structures, including nature-inspired stress-resilient forms for arch bridges. She is an emeritus professor of civil engineering at the University of Warwick.

Education and career
Lewis is originally from Opole, in Poland. After earning diplomas in economics and engineering at the University of Opole, and a master's degree at the University of Birmingham, Lewis earned a PhD in 1982 at the University of Wolverhampton, as the only research assistant at the university, under the auspices of the Council for National Academic Awards.

After working as a schoolteacher and as a borough council structural engineer, she joined the Warwick faculty in 1986. She became the first woman in the Warwick civil engineering department to be promoted as a reader and a professor.

Book
Lewis is the author of the book Tension Structures: Form and Behavior (Thomas Telford, 2003; 2nd ed., ICE Publishing, 2018).

Recognition
Lewis is a Fellow of the Institution of Civil Engineers in 2004, and a Fellow of the Royal Society of Arts in 2020.

References

External links

Year of birth missing (living people)
Living people
British civil engineers
British women engineers
Polish civil engineers
Polish women engineers
Alumni of the University of Birmingham
Alumni of the University of Wolverhampton
Academics of the University of Warwick
Fellows of the Institution of Civil Engineers